Borut Puc (born 19 January 1991) is a Croatian–Slovenian tennis player.

Puc has a career high ATP singles ranking of 466 achieved on 25 July 2011. He also has a career high ATP doubles ranking of 699 achieved on 14 September 2009.

Puc made his ATP main draw debut at the 2011 ATP Studena Croatia Open in the doubles draw partnering Toni Androić.

Borut Puc is the son of Iztok Puc, Slovenian-Croatian handball player. His grandfather, Hrvoje Horvat, also is a former Croatian handball player.

References

External links
 
 

1991 births
Living people
Croatian male tennis players
Slovenian male tennis players
Sportspeople from Bjelovar
Sportspeople from Bradenton, Florida
Croatian people of Slovenian descent
Slovenian people of Croatian descent